Kuktosh Rudaki is a Tajik professional football club based in Rudaki District.

History
They won the 2017 Tajikistan First League and were promoted to the top division Tajikistan Football League for 2018.

In 2018 was debut season in first level and they finished in 3rd position.

On 20 February 2019, Rahmatullo Fuzailov was announced as the club's manager, replacing Alijon Turdinazarov who managed the club during the 2018 season.

Domestic history

Current squad

References

Kuktosh Rudaki